Followership is the actions of someone in a subordinate role. It can also be considered as a specific set of skills that complement leadership, a role within a hierarchical organization, a social construct that is integral to the leadership process, or the behaviors engaged in while interacting with leaders in an effort to meet organizational objectives. As such, followership is best defined as an intentional practice on the part of the subordinate to enhance the synergetic interchange between the follower and the leader.

In organizations, “leadership is not just done by the leader, and followership is not just done by followers.” This perspective suggests that leadership and followership do not operate on one continuum, with one decreasing while the other increases. Rather, each dimension exists as a discrete dimension, albeit with some shared competencies.

The study of followership is an emerging area within the leadership field that helps explain outcomes. Specifically, followers play important individual, relational, and collective roles in organizational failures and successes. “If leaders are to be credited with setting the vision for the department or organization and inspiring followers to action, then followers need to be credited with the work that is required to make the vision a reality.”

The term follower can be used as a personality type, as a position in a hierarchy, as a role, or as a set of traits and behaviors. Studies of followership have produced various theories including trait, behavioral attributes, role, and constructionist theories in addition to exploring myths or misunderstandings about followership.

History 
The relationship between leader/follower is ancient and is referenced throughout history. Examples of leader/follower partnerships are present in the great literatures and wisdom traditions of China such as the I Ching (1000-750 BC), India, and the aboriginal myths of Africa, Australia and the Native Peoples of North and South America.  The best known advice from ancient philosophers came from Aristotle who believed, “He who cannot be a good follower cannot be a leader.” In his time, Aristotle perceived that followership was necessary, albeit mainly as a precursor to what he considered to be a more important role: leader.

Baldasar Castiglione wrote about followers, following and followership in The Book of the Courtier in 1516. During Japan's Edo or Tokugawa period (1603–1868), the Samurai were a class of followers – the very name samurai meant those who served.

In the modern era, followership research began with Mary Parker Follett (1868–1933) who believed that all individuals, regardless of their place in society, deserved respect. She wanted to give more power to individuals and ensure that individuals’ voices were not only heard but were also integrated into solutions. Not only were many of her ideas rejected in the 1930s and 1940s, later theorists also paid limited recognition to her work. Follett's writings have also been underappreciated in contemporary research, despite the fact that her work served as a prelude to many of the developments in the management literature and are still considered timely and insightful by many.  Management theorist Warren Bennis said of Follett's work, "Just about everything written today about leadership and organizations comes from Mary Parker Follett's writings and lectures."

Followership research continued in 1955 when Hollander and Webb (1955) argued that leader and follower was not an either/or proposition in which leaders and followers were found at opposite ends of a continuum. They proposed that the qualities associated with leadership and followership were interdependent. Zelaznik published work in 1964 that focused on the leader-follower relationship by considering the dimensions of dominance vs. submissiveness and activity vs. passivity. Followers have been largely neglected in the study of leadership, an omission addressed by Robert Kelley in his seminal 1988 Harvard Business Review article “In Praise of Followers”. Kelley subsequently wrote The Power of Followership (1992), which preceded and influenced Chaleff (1995), Potter, et al. (1996), Thody (2000), Meilinger (2001), Latour and Rast (2004), Kellerman, (2007), Bossily (2007), and Hurwitz & Hurwitz (2015).

In 1994 the W.K. Kellogg Foundation provided a four-year grant to study leadership that attracted 50 practitioners and scholars to “shed light on some of the most compelling topics in the field.” Three focus groups emerged from the Kellogg Leadership Studies Project (KLSP), one being the Leadership and Followership Focus Group. The conveners of this group were Ed Hollander and Lynn Offermann who published a bound collection of papers called The Balance of Leadership & Followership.

The next major organized activity to bring scholars and practitioners together on the subject of followership occurred in 2008 at Claremont University, chaired by Jean Lipman-Blumen of the Peter Drucker and Mastoshi Ito Graduate School of Management , Ron Riggio of the Kravis Leadership Center and Ira Chaleff, author of The Courageous Follower. Participants included researchers and practitioners mentioned in this article including Robert Kelley, Barbara Kellerman and others. In addition to focusing on the elevating aspects of followership, research was introduced on the problematic aspects of followership including the work of Thomas Blass on the famous Stanley Milgram experiments on obedience and by Jean Lipman-Blumen on why we follow toxic leaders. The book of essays by conference contributors, The Art of Followership, was published as part of the Warren Bennis Leadership Series with a foreword by James MacGregor Burns.

Participants in the KLSP went on to form the International Leadership Association (ILA) as a vehicle for keeping the dialogue alive. Similarly, participants in the Claremont conference went on to form the Followership Learning Community within the ILA with Ira Chaleff as its first chair.  Both of these entities are continuing with this work.

Additional areas of followership that have been studied include:
 Upwards impression management – influencing management through persuasion and other tactics,
Organizational citizenship behaviors  – examples of this include civic virtue, sportsmanship, or helping others,
 Proactive personality theory – the idea that people can influence and shape their own environment,
Leader-member exchange or LMX  – the interchange and relationships between a leader and follower.
Missing from the present research are additional critical components of followership such as the ability to convert strategies into actions that deliver on the actual intent.

Followership in organizations

In the military 
Military perspectives behaviors such as: knows themselves and seeks self-improvement, is technically and tactically proficient, complies with orders and initiates appropriate actions in the absence of orders, develops a sense of responsibility and takes responsibility for own actions, makes sound and timely decisions or recommendations, sets the example for others, is familiar with their leader and their job, and anticipates their requirements, keeps leader informed, understands the task and ethically accomplishes it, a team member, not a yes man. The U.S. Army has produced a new military doctrine called mission command that highlights the role of followers. It acknowledges one of Colin Powell's principles of leadership that "the commander in the field is always right and the rear echelon is wrong, unless proven otherwise." Mission command doctrine was conceived from a wartime environment that enables followers in the field to act according to the dictates of the situation on the ground, giving them maximum discretion. In order to exercise mission command appropriately, commanders must embrace the principles of followership to succeed.

In the nursing profession 
It is vital to understand that, without effective followers in nursing, our leaders face severe limitations. Current leaders and educators must share and promote the vision of enlightened followership if nursing is to achieve its potential.  Research suggests that there is significant difference in organizational effectiveness among nurses with different followership styles – passive, alienated, conformist, pragmatist, or effective.

In education and the classroom 
The appearance of followership in mainstream leadership education books has become more commonplace, including the works of Kouzes & Posner (2012), Jackson & Parry (2011), and Hurwitz & Hurwitz (2015)

Effective followership training in the classroom is challenging because of media messages that preference leadership, internal schemas held by students that ignore followership, and cultural biases against it. Undergraduate and graduate students have been resistant to the idea of followership and followership has been interpreted as leadership poorly enacted or as settling for a lesser position. In recent years, attitudes have begun to change and students have noted that following is an expected, healthy part of a reciprocal relationship in social media and that it did not carry negative connotations.

Although a student's contribution in the classroom has such high significance, the college admissions system has yet to find a way to recognize and reward students who have continuously made these contributions. Given that outstanding classroom contributions have been ignored, yet play such a vital role, it is the responsibility of the college admissions system to find a way to identify them.

In the franchising business model 
Followership, as defined by Hurwitz (2008), is “accepting or enabling [italics original] the goal achievement of one's leader” (p. 11).  In the context of franchising, the franchisee could be seen as a follower because he or she accepts the franchisor's business idea and enables the franchisor's goal achievement through the individual franchise operations.  Leaders can begin by building organizational value for followers and followership; value is a process of incorporating the concept of followership into the organization's culture, policies, and practices.  Because leaders [franchisors] have followers [franchisees] it is their responsibility to set a vision, build trust, and inspire the followers with passion and hope.

In the hospitality industry 
In hospitality and tourism, being an effective follower is important for achieving the service-oriented goals of many operations. In hospitality operations it is often important for followers to work independently of their leaders to carry out important tasks. It has been suggested that incorporating followership into training and education in intentional, purposeful ways could assist operations in hospitality and tourism.

Followership Learning Community of the International Leadership Association 
The Followership Learning Community (FLC) is a learning community within the International Leadership Organization (ILA) and is “dedicated to the development of knowledge, competencies, and programs concerning the leader-follower relationship. It is the first such academic or practice community devoted to the study of followership. It focuses on research, collaboration, and dissemination of ideas and information”.  The current priorities of the FLC are to:
 Help advance followership to a mainstream idea
 Generate greater interest in followership studies
 Develop a network of scholars who focus on leader-follower relationships
 Create a practitioner network of consultants/leaders who employ leader-follower best practices
 Support scholars and practitioners seeking to learn more about followership

Models of followership

Academic followership theories 

Other behavioral traits of effective followership that have been proposed include: a belief in the importance of being a good follower, looks beyond themselves, values their own independence, follows while offering up ideas, self-motivated and self-directed, displays loyalty, considers integrity of paramount importance, functions well in change-oriented environments, functions well on teams, thinks independently and critically, gets involved, generates ideas, willing to collaborate, willing to lead initiatives, develops leaders and themselves, stays current, anticipates, drives own growth, and is a player for all seasons.

Myths and misconceptions about followership 
The traditional notion that leaders are active and followers are passive is mistaken and contributes to misconceptions about the organizational functions of superiors and subordinates. Behaviorists now recognize that active followers influence leaders at every level of the hierarchy, and that leadership itself is a process, not a person.

There are many myths about followership:
 It is a lesser role.
 It is just preparation for being a leader.
 It is managing up, brownnosing or ‘being political'.
 Once you are a leader you are no longer a follower.
 You have to be a good follower to be a good leader.
 Following is passive. It's easy.

For more misconceptions, see Part 1 (Chapters 2-4) of Embracing Followership: How to Thrive in a Leader-Centric Culture.

The future of followership research 
Followership theory offers promise for reinvigorating leadership research in rich new ways:
 Moves beyond leader-centric views to recognize the importance of follower roles and following behaviors making the leadership process more inclusive.
 Distributes responsibility for constructing leadership and its outcomes to all players in the leadership process.
 Focuses us on identifying more and less effective followership behaviors.
 Embeds context within the leadership process.
 Recognizes that leadership can flow in all directions, e.g., not only downward but also upward in a hierarchy when subordinates engage in leading behaviors.
 Allows us to understand why and how managers are not always effective leaders, such as when they are unable to co-construct leadership with their subordinates.
 Promotes followership development, not just leadership development.
Robert Kelley proposes seven areas for further followership research:

 World Events
 Culture
 Leader(ship)
 Follower qualities
 Role of the Follower
 Language of followership
 Courageous Conscience

He challenges the field to focus followership research more on “the big issues happening in the world” such as suicide bombers, religious fundamentalism, democratically elected dictators and corporate abuses of power.

Chaleff calls for a similar focus for research on susceptibility to extremism and the use and development of assessments to help people understand their own tendencies in order to pre-empt their expression in the presence of toxic leaders.

References

Further reading 
 Meilinger, P. S. (2001), “The ten rules of good followership”, in Richard I. Lester and A. Glenn Morton (Eds.), AU-24 Concepts for Air Force Leadership, Air University Press, Maxwell AFB, AL, pp. 99–101.
  DiRienzo, Sharon M. MSN,  A challenge to nursing: Promoting followers as well as leaders.  RNC Holistic Nursing Practice: October 1994

About followership 
 
 Cain, Susan (2017). "Not Leadership Material? Good. The World Needs Followers.", New York Times (Opinion), March 24, 2017.
 Chaleff, I. (2015). Intelligent disobedience: Doing right when what you are told to do is wrong. Oakland, CA: Barrett – Koehler Publishers Inc.
 Collins, J. (2001a). Good to great: Why some companies make the leap and others don't. New York: HarperCollins Publishers, Inc.
 
Hamlin Jr, Allen (2016). "Embracing Followership: How to Thrive in a Leader-Centric Culture". Bellingham, WA: Kirkdale Press.
 Jackson, B., & Parry, K. (2011). A very short, fairly interesting and reasonably cheap book about studying leadership (2nd ed.). London, UK: SAGE Publications, Ltd.
 Kellerman, B. (2012). The end of leadership. New York, NY: HarperCollins Publishers.
 Kouzes, J., & Posner, B. (2012). The leadership challenge (5th ed.). San Francisco, CA: Jossey-Bass.
 L. M. Lapierre, & M. K. Carsten (Eds.), Followership: What is it and why do people follow? (pp. 73–88). Bradford, GBR: Emerald Group Publishing Ltd.
 R. Koonce, M. Bligh, M. K. Carsten, & M. Hurwitz (Eds.), Followership in action: Cases and commentaries. Bingley, England: Emerald Group Publishing.

External links 
 Journal of Leadership Education
 
 Barbara Kellerman, "What every leader needs to know about followers", Harvard Business Review, December 2007.
 
 Embracing Followership blog & resources
 Followership Conference
 Flip University by Hurwitz & Hurwitz

Industrial and organizational psychology
Leadership
Organizational structure